The 1973–74 Irish Cup was the 94th edition of the premier knock-out cup competition in Northern Irish football. 

Ards won the cup for the 4th time, defeating Ballymena United 2–1 in the final at Windsor Park.

The holders Glentoran were eliminated in the first round by Crusaders.

Results

First round

|}

Replay

|}

Second replay

|}

Quarter-finals

|}

Semi-finals

|}

Replay

|}

Second replay

|}

Final

References

External links
The Rec.Sport.Soccer Statistics Foundation - Northern Ireland - Cup Finals

Irish Cup seasons
1973–74 in Northern Ireland association football
1973–74 domestic association football cups